The Bloodhound may refer to:
 The Bloodhound (2020 film)
 The Bloodhound (1925 film)

See also
 Bloodhound (disambiguation)